Mohammed Attiyah (born 5 May 1989) is a Qatari footballer.

References

External links
 

Qatari footballers
1989 births
Living people
Muaither SC players
Naturalised citizens of Qatar
Qatar Stars League players
Qatari Second Division players
Association football midfielders